Artik may refer to:

 Artik, Shirak, Armenia; a town
 Artik BC, a basketball team in Artik, Armenia
 Diocese of Artik, southern Shirak, Armenia; of the Armenian Apostolic Church
 Battle of Artik (1918), Russian Revolution
 Artik (film), 2019 U.S. horror film
 Artik (band), a Russian band headlined by Anna Asti

See also

 
 Artic (disambiguation)
 Arctic (disambiguation)